is a Japanese professional footballer who plays as a defender for Hwaseong FC.

Youth career
Aizu started playing football in his first year at Chitose Elementary School with Seijo Champ SC and after MIP FC, he joined Kashiwa Reysol's academy from the end of the fifth grade of elementary school until he graduated from high school. In May 2014, when he was a member of the Kashiwa U-18 team, he was registered in the first team as a second-class player. He was not promoted to the first team after graduating from high school and went to the University of Tsukuba, where he was a regular in his first year, and in his second year, due to team conditions, he switched from side-half to side-back.

Senior career
He joined FC Gifu in 2019. He decided to join the club after being attracted to the football of coach Takeshi Ohki, with whom he had interacted during his time with the national team for the age group, and made his professional debut on 24 February, playing in the 73rd minute of the opening game against Montedio Yamagata.

On 28 February 2022, Aizu signed with Bulgarian First League club Pirin Blagoevgrad.

National team

In 2011, he was selected for the national team in each age group and toured abroad. In 2013, his second year of high school, he was included in Japan's U-17 national team for the FIFA U-17 World Cup, where he played in all four matches and helped the team reach the top 16.

References

External links

1996 births
Living people
People from Setagaya
People from Tokyo
Sportspeople from Tokyo
Japanese footballers
Japan youth international footballers
Japanese expatriate footballers
Association football defenders
FC Gifu players
PFC Pirin Blagoevgrad players
J2 League players
J3 League players
Expatriate footballers in Sweden
Expatriate footballers in Bulgaria